Bharhutbrahma is the messenger-in-dream of the creator God Brahmaparameshwar of traditional Indian religions which endorse a plethora of so many different kinds of ideas. But the concept of Bharhutbrahma is unique.

See also
 Namasudra

References

Indian religions